Burswood railway station is a railway station on the Transperth network. It is located on the Armadale line, 4.8 kilometres from Perth station serving the suburbs of Burswood, Lathlain and Rivervale.

History
The station was originally to be named Burrswood, however it became Burswood after being misspelt by the station sign's painters when it opened in 1893. The station was renamed Rivervale on 30 May 1923, mirroring that of the suburb that was renamed in 1921 in part due to the public's association of Burswood with sewerage processing; On 31 March 1968, a new platform opened.

However, after the Burswood Resort and Casino was built, the name reverted on 1 May 1994. Rivervale has survived as a suburb 600 metres east of the station.

Station location
The station lies between Goodwood Parade and Victoria Park Drive. There are entrances to the station from either side of the tracks at the southern end of the platform, requiring passengers to cross the tracks at grade level.

Services
Burswood station is served by Transperth Armadale/Thornlie line services.

The station saw 399,398 passengers in the 2013-14 financial year.

Bus routes

References

External links

Gallery History of Western Australian Railways & Stations

Armadale and Thornlie lines
Burswood, Western Australia
Railway stations in Australia opened in 1893
Railway stations in Perth, Western Australia